Jeong Yun-ok (born 4 July 1949) is a South Korean wrestler. He competed in the men's freestyle 57 kg at the 1976 Summer Olympics.

References

1949 births
Living people
South Korean male sport wrestlers
Olympic wrestlers of South Korea
Wrestlers at the 1976 Summer Olympics
Place of birth missing (living people)